Walt Whitman High School may refer to:

Walt Whitman High School (Maryland) in Bethesda, Maryland
Walt Whitman High School (New York) in Huntington Station, New York
Walt Whitman Community School in Dallas, Texas
Walt Whitman High School, fictional high school in the television drama comedy Room 222 (1969-1974)